Imtiaz Sultan Bukhari is a Pakistani politician who served as member of the National Assembly of Pakistan.

Political career
She was elected to the Provincial Assembly of Khyber Pakhtunkhwa as a candidate of Pakistan Muslim League (N) on a seat reserved for women in the 2002 Pakistani general election.

She was elected to the National Assembly of Pakistan as a candidate of Pakistan Muslim League (N) on a seat reserved for women from Khyber Pakhtunkhwa in the 2008 Pakistani general election.

She served as President of the women wing of Pakistan Muslim League (N).

References

Living people
Year of birth missing (living people)
Pakistani MNAs 2008–2013